Saint Patrick School or Saint Patrick's School or St Patrick's School may refer to:

Australia
St Patrick's College, Ballarat, an independent Catholic boys school in the city of Ballarat, Victoria, Australia.

Singapore
Saint Patrick's School, Singapore

United Kingdom
St. Patrick's Grammar School, Armagh in Northern Ireland
St Patrick's Catholic Primary School in Stafford, England

United States
St. Patrick's Episcopal Day School in Washington, D.C.
Saint Patrick School (San Jose, California)
St. Patrick Catholic School (Miami Beach, Florida)
Saint Patrick School (Pelham, New Hampshire)
Saint Patrick School (New Jersey) in Chatham, New Jersey

See also
St. Patrick's High School (disambiguation)
St. Patrick's College (disambiguation)